Grapevine Peak is the highest mountain in the Grapevine Mountains of Nye County in Nevada, United States. It is the fourth-most topographically prominent peak in Nye County and ranks seventeenth among the most topographically prominent peaks in Nevada. The peak is located within the boundaries of Death Valley National Park.

References 

Mountains of Nevada
Mountains of Death Valley National Park
Mountains of Nye County, Nevada